Salomon Berdugo (1854–1906) was a halakhic authority, poet and Chief Rabbi in Meknes, Morocco. He was the son of Rabbi Daniel Berdugo.  In 1897 he was appointed rabbi of the community.  He was the author of Die Hashev, Em le-Mesorot, responsa, a collection of laws and Torah novellae; appended are Musar Kaskel and Shirei Shelomo (1950) as well as many books of Jewish poetry and zmirot.

He married Jimil Choen.  They had seven children.

See also 
 Raphael Berdugo

References 

 Family tree for details.

19th-century Moroccan rabbis
People from Meknes
1854 births
1906 deaths
Moroccan writers
20th-century Moroccan rabbis